India Kids Fashion Week  (IKFw) is an event held quarterly at Delhi, Gurgaon, Mumbai and Bangalore by IKFW Organization. The organization is involved in putting the kids on the ramp, showcasing designers' outfits. It brings together the best designers both national and international, and kids' talent together on the same platform. The age group for participation is 4 to 14 years (both boys and girls). Renowned fashion show director Lokesh Sharma was one of the grooming experts for their initial editions.

Activities 
Apart from the designers' show, IKFw has organized exhibitions, awards for kids and designers, talent recognition on the basis of their performances  and many more backstage activities.

Events

External links
 IKFW. In

References

Fashion events in India
Indian children